Lake Bennet, also spelled Bennett and also known as Lake Blanchard, is a somewhat kidney-shaped natural freshwater lake in Orange County, Florida. Florida State Road 50 (West Colonial Drive) travels over the south end of this lake. On the lake's northeast is the Lake Bennett Health & Rehabilitation Center. This lake is surrounded by commercial properties.

The lake has a fountain on the south end. There are no public boat ramps or swimming areas on this lake. The Hook and Bullet website says this lake contains largemouth bass, bream, bluegill and crappie.

References

Lakes of Florida
Lakes of Orange County, Florida